S. P. Singh (born 1 February 1948), is a professor of biochemistry.

Early life and education 
Singh received his Master's degree from Lucknow University, Uttar Pradesh, India. and his PhD in Medical Biochemistry from Meerut University, Uttar Pradesh, India. He took his early education from a primary village school at Tundla, Agra later on he took his education up to 12th standard from Northern Railways Intermediate college where is father was posted in railways as station master.

Career 
Singh has written nine biochemistry books, one of which (Manual of Practical Biochemistry) has been translated into Persian and one of which has been written in Hindi at the request of HRD Ministry.

In 1973 he founded the Department of Biochemistry at Baba Raghav Das Medical College, Gorakhpur.

He has taught for 40 years and since 1984 he is Head of the Department of Biochemistry at Maharani Laxmi Bai Medical College, Jhansi, Uttar Pradesh. He has so far published 65 research publications in various national and international journals.

He is Vice President of the Uttar Pradesh Chapter of Association of Clinical Biochemists of India.  and serves on the editorial board of the Journal of Advance Researches in Biological Sciences. He is in the society of biological scientists of India,

Honors and awards 
 Honored by International association of bad Club, Jhansi, India (2007)
 Honored by Lions Club, Jhansi, India (1999)
 Honored by Rotary Club, Jhansi, India (1998–99)
 Honored by Janwadi Lekhakh Sangh, Jhansi, India (1997)
 WHO Fellowship at Texas A&M University, U.S.A. (1986)
 Appointed by Medical Council of India as an Inspector to inspect several medical colleges across India
 Appointed by University Grants Commission, Government of India as an Inspector
 Fellow of The Association of Clinical Biochemists of India, ACBI
 Nominated by Government of India for Medical Commonwealth Fellowship, U.K. (1993)

Bibliography 
  
  
  
  
  
  
  
  
   (Hindi)
   (Persian)

References

External links 
 Maharani Laxmi Bai Medical College
 CBS Publishers

1948 births
Living people
Indian biochemists
Indian medical writers
University of Lucknow alumni
Chaudhary Charan Singh University alumni
People from Agra district
Scientists from Uttar Pradesh
20th-century Indian chemists
People from Agra